The 2010–11 Premier Reserve League (officially known as the 2010–11 Barclays Premier Reserve League for sponsorship reasons) was the twelfth season since the establishment of the Premier Reserve League. The season began on 25 August 2010. and ended on 16 May 2011 with Chelsea's reserves beating Blackburn Rovers Reserves 5–4 in a penalty shoot-out after the final had ended 1–1 after extra time.

The events in the senior leagues during the 2009–10 season saw Burnley, Hull City and Portsmouth all relegated and replaced by the promoted teams Newcastle United, West Bromwich Albion and Blackpool. In addition, Birmingham City, Stoke City, and Fulham decided to opt out of the 2010–11 reserve season.

That resulted in 2 major changes to the 2010–11 season.  With the Southern section now only containing six teams, the Northern section was broken into two groups.  Group A consisted of Bolton Wanderers, Manchester City, Manchester United, Newcastle United, and Wigan Athletic. Group B consisted of Blackburn Rovers, Blackpool, Everton, Liverpool, and Sunderland.

The second big change was to the fixture schedule.  Each team played the teams in their own group twice (home and away) and played the teams from the other groups once.  This meant each Northern side played a total of 19 games and the Southern sides played 20 games during the regular season.

At the conclusion of the league season, the two Northern winners faced a play off against each other with the winner facing the Southern champions in a one-off final.

Tables

Premier Reserve League North Group A
Final table as of 5 May 2011

Premier Reserve League North Group B
Final table as of 5 May 2011

Premier Reserve League South
Final table as of 9 May 2011

Rules for classification: 1st points; 2nd goal difference; 3rd goals scoredPos = Position; Pld = Matches played; W = Matches won; D = Matches drawn; L = Matches lost; F = Goals for; A = Goals against; GD = Goal difference; Pts = Points; C = Champions

Play-offs

The play-offs were contested in two stages, first between the two winners of the Reserve League North divisions, and then between the winner of that game and the winner of the Reserve League South.

Semi-final

Final

Top scorers

Premier Reserve League North Group A

Premier Reserve League North Group B

Premier Reserve League South

Promotion and relegation
Teams relegated from the Premier Reserve League at the end of this season:
 Birmingham City F.C.
 Blackpool F.C.
 West Ham United F.C.
Teams promoted to the Premier Reserve League at the end of this season:
 Queens Park Rangers F.C.
 Norwich City F.C.
 Swansea City A.F.C.

See also 
2010–11 Premier Academy League
2010–11 FA Youth Cup
2010–11 Premier League
2010–11 in English football

References

External links

Match reports 

Match reports can be found at each club's official website:

2010-11
2010–11 in English football leagues
Reserve